"Luxury: Cococure" is a song by American R&B singer Maxwell, released as the first single from his second album, Embrya (1998). The song received heavy radio play on mainstream pop and r&b radio markets, but failed to reach either Billboard Hot 100 or R&B songs chart. The single peaked to no. 16 on Hot R&B/Hip-Hop Airplay in 1998.

Critical reception
Larry Flick from Billboard wrote, "Sophomore jinx? Not for this gifted young artist. Maxwell previews his hotly anticipated second set, Embrya, with a sleek funk jam that expands upon the steamy romance of his debut—while revealing a far more confident and primal side of his personality. Within the song's richly textured arrangement, a slippery bassline glides over a rugged beat, supporting plush keyboards and swirling strings. There is no question that this single will flood R&B airwaves within seconds. Perhaps popsters would be wise to join the party a little earlier this time around."

Charts

References

1998 singles
Maxwell (musician) songs
Columbia Records singles
Songs written by Maxwell (musician)
1998 songs